Lake Tempe is a lake in South Sulawesi, Indonesia. The town of Sengkang is situated to the east of the lake.

See also
 List of lakes of Indonesia

Tempe
Landforms of South Sulawesi